Liechtenstein Border Guard was Liechtenstein's border guard, founded in 1919, following the end of Austria-Hungary which prior provided its Border Police to the Principality, and disbanded in 1923, when Liechtenstein signed a customs union treaty with Switzerland and gave to the Swiss Border Guard this duty.

References 
Grenzwache

Law enforcement in Liechtenstein